Uniform Map (Chinese: 制服地圖) is a website of school uniforms, established in 2013, the website is based on Google Maps. Now Uniform Map has collected information of school uniforms around the world, some information of uniforms in animation, and some introductions related to uniforms.

Introduction 
Uniform Map was a experimental website which based on Google Maps, the founder wanted to sort out information of school uniforms of senior high schools in Taiwan, combined the collection of these information with Google Maps, then the website was established. Afterwards, it started collecting information of school uniforms around the world. Nowadays, Uniform Map had over 20 uniform map themes in all 5 continents in the world, and collected school uniform information of over 10,000 schools.

The website started collecting uniforms of animations since 2016.

Countries 
Uniform Map was established in May 2013. First it  collecting uniforms of all senior high schools in Taiwan, then of all junior high schools in Taiwan. Then it developed similar collections for Hong Kong, Macau, Malaysia and Singapore. After completed the collection of these countries, the itexpanded the collection to Japan, South Korea, Australia and New Zealand, etc, from the end of 2015 to start of 2016. Then it started collecting school uniform information of United Kingdom, where the school uniform originated, and then it also collected school uniform information of United States, Canada, South Africa, etc. Nowadays (counted to September 2018), The Uniform Map had developed uniform maps of 24 countries, collected school uniform pictures of over 10,000 schools around the world. Uniform maps of senior high schools in Taiwan, junior high schools in Taiwan, high schools in Hong Kong, Macau, Singapore, Australia, New Zealand and senior high schools in Japan has totally completed.

On September 6, 2018, Uniform Map had collected school uniform of 10,000 schools around the world.

Uniform Contest

1st Annual Uniform Contest (2014) 
On 2014, the Uniform Map held the "Taiwan School Uniform Contest", people could vote for the best school uniform in their minds by login their Facebook account. Yongping Vocational High School from Taoyuan City won the champion of 1st Annual Uniform Contest by obtained the most votes.

2nd Annual Uniform Contest (2015) 
On 2015, the "Taiwan School Uniform Contest" consists of 3 events, including "Best Sailor Suit Uniform Contest", "Best Checkered Skirt Uniform Contest" and "Overall Uniform Contest". National Chia-Chi Girls' Senior High School won the champion of "Best Sailor Suit Uniform Contest". Nan Ying Senior Commercial & Industrial Vocational School won the champion of "Best Checkered Skirt Uniform Contest" . Kao-Yuan Vocational High School of Technology & Commerce won the champion of 2nd Annual Uniform Contest. 

The score consists of Voting (50%), Page Views (by Google Analytics, 10%) and Reviewer's Scores (40%).

3rd Annual Uniform Contest (2016) 
On 2016, the 3rd Annual "Taiwan School Uniform Contest" splits into Preliminary Contest and Final Contest, top 12 schools with most votes could advances to the Finals.

In the Finals, the contest consists of "Best Uniform", "Best Girls' Uniform" and "Best Boys' Uniform". National Chia-Chi Girls' Senior High School won both champions of "Best Uniform" and "Best Girls' Uniform", Nan Ying Senior Commercial & Industrial Vocational School won the champion of "Best Boys' Uniform".

4th Annual Uniform Contest (2017) 
On 2017

5th Annual Uniform Contest (2018) 
On 2018

References 
 台湾の女子学生の制服を確認できる「制服地図」がすごい！
 台湾の女子学生制服マップが登場!!
 https://www.chinatimes.com/newspapers/20140502001035-260603?chdtv
 「制服地圖」問世　校服美女即點即看

External links 
Uniform Map 制服地圖 - the website
https://b.hatena.ne.jp/entry/weather.datamining.tw/uniform/

Uniforms
School uniform